Florentino Sanico Solon (September 17, 1931 – June 17, 2020) was a Filipino nutritionist and politician who served as the mayor of Cebu City from 1978 to 1983. He served as the first executive director of the Nutrition Center of the Philippines in 1974 and as Deputy Minister of Health from 1983 to 1986 during the presidency of Ferdinand Marcos.

Early life and education 
Solon was born to Pio Palacio and Ricarda Sanico Solon. He earned a master's degree in public health at University of the Philippines Manila and a doctor of medicine at University of Santo Tomas. He also obtained a diploma in nutrition from the London School of Hygiene & Tropical Medicine.

Early career 
Solon started as a municipal health officer in Carmen, Cebu and later on worked for the regional office of the Ministry of Health while being a lecturer at Cebu Institute of Medicine. He became the first executive director of the National Nutrition Council (NNC) on July 16, 1974 and founding director of the Nutrition Center of the Philippines in 1974. He served in the NNC until December 31, 1979 and was succeeded by Delfina Aguillon.

Political career 
Appointed as mayor of Cebu City, Solon was sworn in by then President Ferdinand Marcos on October 11, 1978 and assumed the position on October 16, 1978. Solon then took part in the 1980 elections where he was eventually elected as mayor along with Ronald Duterte as his vice mayor.

During Solon's stint as mayor, the Sinulog Festival was realized after David S. Odilao Jr., then regional director of the Ministry of Sports and Youth Development, organized the first Sinulog parade involving several schools and eventually turned over the organizing of such to the Cebu City Historical Committee under Jesus B. Garcia Jr.

In 1983, Solon was tapped by Marcos to serve as the deputy minister for health.

Personal life 
Solon was married to Mercedes Aseniero. His son, Juan Antonio Aseniero Solon, is the current president of the Nutrition Center of the Philippines.

Death 
Solon died at the age of 88 on June 17, 2020.

Selected publications

References

External links 
 SPHERES Profile of Florentino S. Solon

|-

1931 births
2020 deaths
People from Cebu City
Cebuano people
Mayors of Cebu City
Filipino nutritionists
Kilusang Bagong Lipunan politicians
University of Santo Tomas alumni
University of the Philippines Manila alumni
Alumni of the London School of Hygiene & Tropical Medicine